Future Lovers may refer to:
A song from the Madonna album Confessions on a Dance Floor (2005).
A manga series, Future Lovers (manga).